Francisco Cimadevilla González (10 May 1861 Valladolid – 19 August 1931 Madrid) was a Spanish guitarist and composer. He was a contemporary of Francisco Tárrega. Cimadevilla mainly transcribed and arranged several well-known guitar pieces, also composing a small number of lounge music and folk music.

Legacy 
His prominent students were Felicidad Rodríguez Serrano, Miguel de la Mano, and Miguel Iruela.
The flamenco works by him and Julián Arcas mildly influenced Manuel de Falla's compositional style.

Notes

References

External links
 
 Guajiras from Album Flamenco

1861 births
1931 deaths
Spanish male composers
Spanish guitarists
People from Valladolid